The Boogens is a 1981 American monster film directed by James L. Conway and starring Rebecca Balding, Fred McCarren, Anne-Marie Martin, Jeff Harlan, John Crawford, Med Flory, Jon Lormer, and Scott Wilkinson. The title refers to scaly turtle-like monsters that are released from an abandoned and boarded-up silver mine, and begin to wreak havoc.

Plot

A small construction team of four men work to reopen an abandoned silver mine, 100 years after a mysterious massacre forced the military to shut it down. What they don't know is that their excavating has inadvertently freed some reptilian creatures lurking deep within the mine shafts.

Cast
 Rebecca Balding as Trish Michaels
 Fred McCarren as Mark Kinner
 Anne-Marie Martin as Jessica Ford
 Jeff Harlan as Roger Lowrie
 John Crawford as Brian Deering
 Med Flory as Dan Ostroff
 Jon Lormer as Blanchard
 Scott Wilkinson as Deputy Greenwalt

Production
The Boogens was produced by Charles E. Sellier Jr. and Bill Cornfold, and written by Thomas C. Chapman, David O'Malley and Jim Kouf (as Bob Hunt).

Parts of the film were shot in Park City, Kamas, Ontario Mine, Mayflower Mine, and Heber in Utah.

Release
The Boogens opened in US theaters on September 25, 1981, distributed by independent outfit Jensen Farley Pictures.

Home media
The film was released on VHS by Lions Gate on July 14, 1998. It was released on DVD and Blu-ray by Olive Films (under license from Paramount Home Entertainment) on August 7, 2012.

Reception
On aggregator website Rotten Tomatoes, The Boogens holds a 33% approval rating,  with a rating average of 4.7 based on nine reviews.

TV Guide gave it 1 out of 5 stars, criticizing the film's incoherent plot. Dennis Schwartz of Ozus' World Movie Reviews gave the film a grade C+, stating, "At best, it's a so-so horror pic".

Brett Gallman from Oh, the Horror! gave the film a positive review, writing, "A charming little homespun monster movie, it's a far cry from many of its gooey, splattery contemporaries, and it's armed with a solid cast that makes it personable in the absence of an abundance of on-screen carnage. All told, a pretty good flick was mined from the old monster movie standard". The A.V. Club critic Keith Phipps described the film as "charmingly clunky", and said that it "plays like a cross between the then-omnipresent slasher films and a '50s monster movie". Diabolique critic Samm Deighan called it "a charming, if sedate mishmash of horror genres and tropes", but praised the acting, saying that "The Boogens''' small, intimate cast is surprisingly solid, and its characters are likable", and that "despite the low budget, the sets and effects are solid".

The film notably received a positive review from author Stephen King in The Twilight Zone Magazine''.

References

External links
 
 

1981 films
1981 horror films
1980s monster movies
American monster movies
Films directed by James L. Conway
Films shot in Utah
Taft Entertainment Pictures films
1980s English-language films
1980s American films
American independent films